Raseiniai County was one of the counties of the Russian Empire with its seat in Raseiniai from 1793 until 1915 when it became a part of Lithuania District in Oberost.

History
Established 1795 under the rule of  Vilna Governorate. 1842 transferred to Kovno Governorate.

Demographics
At the time of the Russian Empire Census of 1897, Rossiyensky Uyezd had a population of 235,362. Of these, 76.2% spoke Lithuanian, 11.2% Yiddish, 5.5% Polish, 4.4% German, 2.0% Russian, 0.3% Ukrainian, 0.1% Belarusian and 0.1% Latvian as their native language.

References

 
Uezds of Kovno Governorate
Uezds of Vilna Governorate
Kovno Governorate